The Armed Services Vocational Aptitude Battery (ASVAB) is a multiple choice test, administered by the United States Military Entrance Processing Command, used to determine qualification for enlistment in the United States Armed Forces. It is often offered to U.S. high school students when they are in the 10th, 11th and 12th grade, though anyone eligible for enlistment may take it.

History 
The ASVAB was first introduced in 1968 and was adopted by all branches of the military in 1976. It underwent a major revision in 2002. In 2004, the test's percentile rank scoring system was renormalized, to ensure that a score of 50% really did represent doing better than exactly 50% of the test takers.

Categories

Format 
The ASVAB contains nine sections and takes three hours to complete. The duration of each section varies between 7 and 39 minutes, the longest being for Arithmetic Reasoning. The test is typically administered in a computerized format at Military Entrance Processing Stations (MEPS) or in a written format at satellite locations called Military Entrance Test (MET) sites. Testing procedures vary depending on the mode of administration.

Computerized test format 
 General Science (GS) – 15 questions in 8 minutes
 Arithmetic Reasoning (AR) – 15 questions in 39 minutes
 Word Knowledge (WK) – 15 questions in 8 minutes
 Paragraph Comprehension (PC) – 10 questions in 22 minutes
 Mathematics Knowledge (MK) – 15 questions in 20 minutes
 Electronics Information (EI) – 15 questions in 8 minutes
 Automotive and Shop Information (AS) – 10 questions in 7 minutes
 Mechanical Comprehension (MC) – 15 questions in 20 minutes
 Assembling Objects (AO) – 15 questions in 40 minutes
 Verbal Expression (VE) Score = (WK)+(PC)

Written test format 
 General Science (GS) – 45 questions in 20 minutes
 Arithmetic Reasoning (AR) – 30 questions in 36 minutes
 Word Knowledge (WK) – 35 questions in 11 minutes
 Paragraph Comprehension (PC) – 15 questions in 13 minutes
 Mathematics Knowledge (MK) – 25 questions in 24 minutes
 Electronics Information (EI) – 20 questions in 9 minutes
 Automotive and Shop Information (AS) – 25 questions in 11 minutes
 Mechanical Comprehension (MC) – 25 questions in 19 minutes
 Assembling Objects (AO) – 25 questions in 15 minutes
 Verbal Expression (VE) Score = (WK)+(PC)

Navy applicants also complete a Coding Speed (CS) test.

Previous 
 "Numerical Operations" (NO)
 "Space Perception" (SP)
 "Tool Knowledge" (TK)
 "General Information" (GI)
 "Attention to Detail" (AD)
 "Coding Speed" (CS)

Armed Forces Qualification Test 
An Armed Forces Qualification Test (AFQT) score is used to determine basic qualifications for enlistment.

The AFQT scores are divided into the following categories

 Category I: 93–99
 Category II: 65–92
 Category III A: 50–64
 Category III B: 31–49
 Category IV A: 21–30
 Category IV B: 16–20
 Category IV C: 10–15
 Category V: 0–9

- The formula for computing an AFQT score is: AR + MK + (2 × VE).

- The VE (verbal) score is determined by adding the raw scores from the PC and WK tests and using a table to get the VE score from that combined PC and WK raw score.

- AFQT scores are not raw scores, but rather percentile scores indicating how each examinee performed compared with the base youth population. Thus, someone who receives an AFQT of 55 scored better than 55 percent of all other members of the base youth population. The highest possible percentile is 99.

- The minimum score for enlistment varies according to branch of service and whether the enlistee has a high school diploma.

GED holders who earn 15 college credits 100 level or greater are considered equivalent to those holding high school diplomas so they need only the Tier I score to enlist. Eligibility is not determined by the score alone. Certain recruiting goal practices may require an applicant to achieve a higher score than the required minimum AFQT score in order to be considered for enlistment. Rules and regulations are subject to change; applicants should call their local recruiting center for up-to-date qualification information.

Law prohibits applicants in Category V from enlisting. In addition, there are constraints placed on Category IV recruits; recruits in Category IV must be high school diploma graduates but cannot be denied enlistment solely on this criteria if the recruit is needed to satisfy established strength requirements. Furthermore, the law constrains the percentage of accessions who can fall between Categories IV-V (currently, the limit is 20% of all persons originally enlisted in a given armed force in a given fiscal year).

Composite scores 

In addition to the ASVAB's AFQT, each branch has military occupational specialty, or MOS, scores. Combinations of scores from the nine tests are used to determine qualification for a MOS. These combinations are called "aptitude area scores", "composite scores", or "line scores". Each of the five armed services has its own aptitude area scores and sets its own minimum composite scores for each MOS.

Air Force/Air National Guard Composite Scores (Standard AFQT score AR + MK + (2 x VE))

See also
 Intelligence and public policy
 Project 100,000

References

Further reading 

Marks, D.F. (2010). "IQ variations across time, race, and nationality: an artifact of differences in literacy skills". Psychological Reports, 106, 643-664. 
Kaufman, S.B. (2010). "The Flynn Effect and IQ Disparities Among Races, Ethnicities, and Nations: Are There Common Links?"

External links 
ASVAB test description: Includes structure of the test, time allotted per section of the test and which sections are counted towards the Armed Forces Qualifying Test (AFQT) score.
What is the ASVAB test?, GoArmy.com.
ASVAB Practice Test, ASVABAdvantage.com.

Entrance examinations
Military education and training in the United States
Standardized tests in the United States